Chhena gaja is a sweet dish from Odisha, India. Unlike some other popular chhena-based Odia desserts, such as rasagola, which have spread throughout India, the chhena gaja remains largely popular within the state itself.

Although the ingredients of chhena gaja are essentially the same as that of rasagolla and chhena poda, the dishes are very different in taste.

One of the best places to savor chhena gajas is Pahala, near Bhubaneswar. However, chhena gaja is equally popular all over Odisha.

Preparation
Chhena gajas are prepared by combining chhena, similar to cottage cheese, and sooji (semolina), and kneading the dough thoroughly. Water is squeezed out from the mixture, which is then dried briefly until it acquires the right consistency. It is then molded into palm-sized rectangular shapes (gajas), boiled in thick sugar syrup. Sometimes, the gajas are then allowed to dry a little more, in which case the sugar may occasionally crystallize on the surface.

See also

Chhena jalebi
Chhena kheeri
Chhena poda
Khira sagara
Rasabali
Rasagolla
 List of cheese dishes

References

External links
www.odisharasagola.com

Indian cheese dishes
Indian desserts
Odia cuisine